Tsüngiki, which means Abode of Cloud, is a Lotha Naga village located in Chukitong Circle of Wokha District, Nagaland with a total of 556 families residing.

People 
The Tsüngiki village has population of 3320 of which 1667 are males while 1653 are females as per Population Census 2011. They speak the Lotha language. The people from Tsüngiki village are Christian. Tsüngiki Village celebrated its 100 Years of Christianity in January 2018.

Distance from Nearby Towns
Wokha is nearest town to Tsüngiki which is approximately 18km away. The surrounding nearby villages and its distance from Tsüngiki are Mungya 2.5km, Koio 3.4km, Seluku 3.8km, Chukitong 4.2km, Yimkha 4.6km, Longla 6.2km, Nungying 6.3km, Yanthamo 6.4km.

Crops and its Benefits
Tsüngiki Village has fertile soil suiting many crops. The Way side Market On NH-61 helps in sustaining and maintaining the economic growth of the villagers.

Place of Interest
Dongti is a place a hill where a Viewing Tower has been constructed where one can view neighboring villages and far Towns and scenic beauty of the mountains and the majestic Doyang River. Also one can come and witness traditional fishing(using tree roots)which is jointly held between Tsüngiki Village and the neighboring villages of Sümi Naga at Doyang River to harbor friendship and harmonious relationship of the old bond and ties.

References

 Tsungiki Population
 Tsungiki Village

Villages in Wokha district